Marcin Burkhardt (born 25 September 1983) is a Polish professional footballer who plays as a midfielder for Weszło Warsaw. From 2021 to 2022 he served as a sporting director of Pogoń Siedlce.

Career

Club
Burkhardt made his debut in the Polish league on September 16, 2001 in Amica Wronki against Dyskobolia Grodzisk and has scored seven goals as of this campaign. For Legia he scored 4 goals – in matches Amica-Legia, Dyskobolia-Legia, Wisla Plock-Legia and Odra Wodzislaw-Legia. He played for Legia Warsaw until 30 March 2008. The day after he joined the IFK Norrköping squad for three years.

On 19 August 2009 Burkhardt left IFK Norrköping for Metalist Kharkiv for three years.

In February 2010, Burkhardt was loaned to Jagiellonia Białystok on a half year deal. He was sold to this club one year later.

During the summer of 2012 Burkhardt signed for Azerbaijan Premier League club Simurq. Burkhardt played 24 times for Simurq, scoring 5 times, during the 2012–13 season.

On 8 September 2014, Burkhardt signed for Bulgarian side Cherno More. He made his debut coming on as a substitute for Todor Palankov in a league game against CSKA Sofia on 13 September. On 20 March 2015, Burkhardt scored the only goal in Cherno More's 1–0 victory over Marek Dupnitsa. He ended his debut campaign at Cherno More with 4 goals in all competitions. In June 2015, Burkhardt signed a new contract with the club keeping him with the Sailors until the end of the 2015–16 season. However, he left the team in December 2015 due to injury issues.

On 15 December 2017, Burkhardt joined III liga team Motor Lublin.

International
For Poland, Burkhardt has appeared 10 times and scored one goal.

Career statistics

International

Statistics accurate as of 9 September 2014

International goals
Scores and results list Poland's goal tally first.

Honours

Club
Legia Warsaw
 Ekstraklasa: 2005–06
 Polish Cup: 2007–08

Jagiellonia Białystok
 Polish Cup: 2010
 Polish Super Cup: 2010

Cherno More
 Bulgarian Cup: 2014–15

Personal life
He is the brother of Filip Burkhardt.

References

External links
 

1983 births
Living people
Polish footballers
Polish expatriate footballers
Amica Wronki players
Legia Warsaw players
IFK Norrköping players
FC Metalist Kharkiv players
Jagiellonia Białystok players
Simurq PIK players
Miedź Legnica players
PFC Cherno More Varna players
Ullensaker/Kisa IL players
MKP Pogoń Siedlce players
Motor Lublin players
Gryf Wejherowo players
KTS Weszło Warsaw players
Ekstraklasa players
I liga players
II liga players
III liga players
Ukrainian Premier League players
Azerbaijan Premier League players
Allsvenskan players
First Professional Football League (Bulgaria) players
Sportspeople from Warmian-Masurian Voivodeship
People from Elbląg
Expatriate footballers in Sweden
Expatriate footballers in Ukraine
Expatriate footballers in Bulgaria
Expatriate footballers in Azerbaijan
Polish expatriate sportspeople in Sweden
Polish expatriate sportspeople in Ukraine
Expatriate footballers in Norway
Polish expatriate sportspeople in Norway
Norwegian First Division players
Association football midfielders
Poland international footballers
Polish expatriate sportspeople in Azerbaijan